GLPG-0492 (DT-200) is a drug which acts as a selective androgen receptor modulator (SARM). It has been investigated for the treatment of cachexia and muscular dystrophy.

See also 
 ACP-105
 Enobosarm
 JNJ-28330835
 Ligandrol

References 

Selective androgen receptor modulators
Trifluoromethyl compounds
Hydantoins
Nitriles
Hydroxymethyl compounds